Alexander Scheer (born 1 June 1976 in East Berlin) is a German actor and musician. He has won several national awards for his performances in film and theater, including one German Film Award for "Best Actor in a Leading Role" and one Bavarian Film Award for "Best Actor", both in the year 2019.

Biography 
In addition to the singing, he played piano and drums in different bands. He left school after the 11th grade and then took up various occupations. He also occurred as a performer in commercials during this period and turned their own amateur films with his friends. During a casting, he was discovered by the director Leander Haussmann, who cast him in his 1999 film Sonnenallee. After the shooting, Scheer and Haußmann followed to the Schauspiel Bochum theater. There he played among other things in various plays such as Much Ado About Nothing, Leonce and Lena, and The Tempest.

For the personification of the English Shakespearean actor Edmund Kean in Frank Castorf's production of the same name in 2009, Scheer was voted Actor of the Year by the theater magazine Theater heute. In addition to his theater engagements, he was also in the national and international productions such as Viktor Vogel – Commercial Man, Eight Miles High, Mrs Ratcliffe's Revolution, and Carlos (miniseries) which its full 5½-hour version was shown out of competition at the 2010 Cannes Film Festival.

To prepare for the portrayal of Keith Richards in the film Eight Miles High, Scheer founded the band The Rockboys which played concerts for one summer. In 2007 he joined Jan Opoczynski as guitarist in his band . In the following year, he became the front man of the Viennese band Gruppe Pegel. In 2009 he toured Europe as a percussionist with The Whitest Boy Alive. In 2012 he appeared as Mephistopheles in the Johann Wolfgang von Goethe's tragedy play Faust, Part One.

Scheer played a total of 16 years under the direction of Frank Castorf at the Volksbühne Berlin. The decision of the secretary for cultural affairs of Berlin, Tim Renner, caused Castorf's contract as director not to be extended and Scheer was critical of it. He then asked Tim Renner not to enter the theater again, and when Scheer met Renner there in 2018 after a film screening, he poured a glass of beer over his head.

In the Andreas Dresen's 2018 biographical film Gundermann about the East German songwriter, rock musician, and skilled excavator operator Gerhard Gundermann, Scheer played the title role and sang all the songs himself. For this role, he was awarded German Film Award (Deutscher Filmpreis) the most important cinema awards in Germany and the most highly endowed German cultural awards, for the Best Actor in a Leading Role in 2019.

In the television series , he embodied the British musician David Bowie.

Scheer was in a long-term relationship with the fashion designer .

Filmography

Film

Television

Awards
 2006: Der Faust (a German theater prize), the best performer of a drama performance (nomination)
 2008:  (a German theater prize), originality and best actor
 2009: , honorary title by the German magazine Theater heute, for Kean
 2018:  (a German film awards), best actor for his role in Gundermann
 2019: Bavarian Film Awards, best actor for Gundermann
 2019: Berliner Kunstpreis (Berlin Art Prize) for performing arts (Darstellende Kunst)
 2019: German Film Award – "Best Actor in a Leading Role" for Gundermann

References

External links

 
 

1976 births
German male stage actors
German male film actors
Audiobook narrators
German Film Award winners
People from Berlin
East German actors
Living people